Yekta Güngör Özden (born 1932) is a Turkish judge, and former president of the Constitutional Court of Turkey.

He was born in Niksar, a town in Tokat province of Turkey, in 1932. He was the president of the Constitutional Court of Turkey, from May 8, 1991 until May 8, 1995, and from May 25, 1995 until January 1, 1998, when he retired. He also was the head of "Atatürkçü Düşünce Derneği" (ADD), a leading Turkish non-governmental organization, that has organized Republic Protests, a peaceful mass rally of more than 300,000 people, in Ankara, on April 14–15, 2007.

Recently, he was implicated in the Ergenekon scandal, for allegedly being a CIA . The journalist who made the accusation, Zihni Çakır, has been detained on charges of acquiring state secrets and fraudulent bankruptcy.

Notes

References
 Biography of Yekta Güngör Özden, Biyografi.net

Turkish judges
1932 births
Turkish civil servants
Living people
People from Niksar
Presidents of the Constitutional Court of Turkey
Sözcü people